The 2010–11 Handball-Bundesliga is the 46th season of the Handball-Bundesliga, Germany's premier handball league, and the 34th season consisting of only one league. The season started on the weekend of 25 August 2010 and will end with the last games on 4 June 2011. The defending champions are THW Kiel. As in previous years the league is sponsored by Toyota and carries the official name Toyota-Handball-Bundesliga.

Team information 
GWD Minden and HSG Düsseldorf were directly relegated after finishing in the bottom two places.

The relegated teams were replaced by HSG Ahlen-Hamm, champions of the 2009–10 2. Handball-Bundesliga North, and TSG Friesenheim, champions of the 2009-10 2. Handball-Bundesliga South.

A further place in the league was decided through a two-legged play-off between the 16th placed team of the previous season and the play-off winner between the two second placed teams of the two 2. Bundesligas. This play-off was won by DHC Rheinland who had finished the previous season in 16th place.

Arenas and locations 

Notes:
 VfL Gummersbach play high-profile matches which attract a large crowd at the Lanxess Arena.
 Füchse Berlin generally play at the Max-Schmeling-Halle, however, as this is a multi-use venue some matches may clash with other events and hence are moved to the O2 World Arena.
 Frisch Auf Göppingen's home venue EWS Arena is currently undergoing renovation/expansion works. In the meantime, all matches are played at Stuttgart's Porsche-Arena.
 TV Großwallstadt play in Großwallstadt, however, move to Aschaffenburg for high-profile matches.

League table 
* Der DHC Rheinland steht nach einem Insolvenzverfahren als Zwangsabsteiger fest.

Key

Results 
In the table below the home teams are listed on the left and the away teams along the top.

Relegation play-off 
The two second placed teams from the two 2. Handball-Bundesligas play a two-legged play-off to determine the 3rd placed team. The winner of this play of then faces the Bundesliga 16th-placed team for another two-legged play-off. The winner on aggregate score after both matches will earn the final spot in the 2011–12 Handball-Bundesliga.

Statistics

Top goalscorers 
Source:  (German)

References

External links 
 Kicker magazine 

2010-11
2010 in German sport
2011 in German sport
2010–11 domestic handball leagues